Dorit Aharonov (born 1970) is an Israeli computer scientist specializing in quantum computing.

Aharonov graduated from Weizmann Institute of Science with an MSc in Physics. She received her doctorate for Computer Science in 1999 from the Hebrew University of Jerusalem, and her thesis was entitled Noisy Quantum Computation. She also did her post-doctorate in the mathematics department of Princeton University and in the computer science department of University of California Berkeley. She was a visiting scholar at the Institute for Advanced Study in 1998–99.

Aharonov was an invited speaker in International Congress of Mathematicians 2010, Hyderabad on the topic of "Mathematical Aspects of Computer Science".

Research
Aharonov's research is mainly about quantum information processes, which includes:
 quantum algorithms
 quantum cryptography and computational complexity
 quantum error corrections and fault tolerance
 connections between quantum computation and quantum Markov chains and lattices
 quantum Hamiltonian complexity and its connections to condensed matter physics
 transition from quantum to classical physics
 understanding entanglement by studying quantum complexity

References

External links
 Aharonov's home page at the Hebrew University of Jerusalem
 Profile in Nature
 Dorit Aharonov in panel discussion, "Harnessing Quantum Physics" with Michele Mosca, Avi Wigderson, Daniel Gottesman, Peter Shor, and Ignacio Cirac.

Israeli computer scientists
1970 births
Living people
Israeli women computer scientists
Women mathematicians
Institute for Advanced Study visiting scholars
Hebrew University of Jerusalem alumni
Weizmann Institute of Science alumni
Quantum information scientists